Henry Tilney is the leading man in Jane Austen's 1817 novel Northanger Abbey.  The younger son of a local landowner, Tilney is comfortably placed as a beneficed clergyman on his father's estate.

Character
Tilney, with his teasing yet kind-hearted mentorship of Catherine, has been considered the nicest of Austen's heroes. At the same time, with his knowledge of muslin and of Gothic novels, he is the least masculine of heroes. Overshadowed by his military father and elder brother, he is a strangely passive figure, falling for Catherine only after she falls for him, and with his father as the driving force behind her coming to the Abbey. Nevertheless, he does not lack moral courage, as he shows with his marriage at the book's close.

Origins
Frank Swinnerton considered that, as a teasing mentor, knowledgeable on female matters, Tilney might represent a disguised version of the author herself. Later critics, more cautiously, have seen him as representing in part the author's "voice".

Sydney Smith, who is known to have overlapped with Austen in Bath at the close of the eighteenth century, and whose witty conversation resembles Tilney's, has also been seen as a possible model for the character. So too has Austen's witty brother Henry: “affectionate & kind as well as entertaining....he cannot help being amusing”.

See also

References

Northanger Abbey characters
Literary characters introduced in 1817
Fictional gentry